A Scuderi cycle is a thermodynamic cycle that is constructed out of the following series of thermodynamic processes:

 A-B and C-D (TOP and BOTTOM of the loop): a pair of quasi-parallel adiabatic processes
 D-A (LEFT side of the loop): a positively sloped, increasing pressure, increasing volume process
 B-C (RIGHT side of the loop): an isochoric process

The adiabatic processes are impermeable to heat: heat flows rapidly into the loop through the left expanding process, resulting in increasing pressure while volume is increasing; some of it flows back out through the right depressurizing process; the remaining heat does the work.

See also
 Scuderi engine

References

Thermodynamics
Thermodynamic cycles